Dollars and Sense is a 1920 American silent drama film directed by Harry Beaumont and starring Madge Kennedy, Kenneth Harlan and Willard Louis.

Cast
 Madge Kennedy as Hazel Farron
 Kenneth Harlan as David Rogers
 Willard Louis as Geoffrey Stanhope
 Florence Deshon as Daisy
 Richard Tucker as George Garrison

References

Bibliography
 Cooper C. Graham & Christoph Irmscher. Love and Loss in Hollywood: Florence Deshon, Max Eastman, and Charlie Chaplin. Indiana University Press, 2021.

External links
 

1920 films
1920 drama films
1920s English-language films
American silent feature films
Silent American drama films
American black-and-white films
Films directed by Harry Beaumont
Goldwyn Pictures films
1920s American films